Fuest is a surname. Notable people with the surname include:

Clemens Fuest (born 1968), German economist
Irmgard Fuest (1903–1980), German politician and lawyer
Robert Fuest (1927–2012), English film director, screenwriter, and production designer

German-language surnames